The Royal People Party is a populist political party in Thailand.
The party was established and registered at the Electoral Commission on February 10, 2006, by Sanoh Thienthong, former Thai Rak Thai party chairman.

After the establishment, Sanoh tapped many well known individuals, such as former Deputy Prime Minister Purachai Piemsomboon, Head of the Office of the Attorney General Khunying Jaruvan Maintaka and Secretary General of the Chaipattana Foundation Sumet Tuntivejakul, to be the leader of the party, but all of them turned down the offer. Thus, Sanoh became the leader with Prachai Leophai-ratana elected as Secretary-General and Pramuan Rujanaseri elected as the Deputy Leader.

On September 20, 2007, at the party's annual congress, Sanoh Thienthong was voted unanimously to remain leader, but Prachai Liewpairat became the party's chairman. Anongwan Thepsuthin became the new party's Secretary General.

On October 5, 2007, Prachai set up a press conference and announced his resignation due to policy conflicts. He and the party's Secretary General resigned and became Matchima Party members. Chienchuang Kanlayanamith replaced Anongwan Thepsuthin as the new Secretary General.

On December 2, 2008 the People's Power Party was banned by the Constitutional Court of Thailand due to electoral fraud occurring in the run-up to the 2007 parliamentary election. This action automatically resulted in the dissolution of the governing coalition. Thereafter, the leaders of the party including Uraiwan Thienthong (Sanoh's wife) announced that the party would not join any Democrat-led government coalition.

In 2018, Pracharaj Party was dissolved by order of Election Commission of Thailand.

2007 Election
The 12 main policies
Promotion of sufficiency economy
Suppression of corruption and fraud 
Bring peace back to the South of Thailand
Appropriate documentation of land
Protection of natural resources
Support for poor farmers. Establishment of agricultural cooperatives. Review of Free Trade Agreements
Solve debt problems of farmers
Free education for students until Grade 12
Protection of the rights and interests of organized labor
Ensure protection of children's rights, rights of elderly people and rights of people with disabilities
Restore public health care
Broadening of the tax base

The party has announced that if the party was to win the plurality of votes and thus the right to form the necessary, majority coalition government, the party's deputy leader, Korn Dabbaransi, would become the Prime Minister instead of the traditional policy of the party's leader, Sanoh Thienthong, becoming prime minister.

References

2006 establishments in Thailand
2019 disestablishments in Thailand
Defunct political parties in Thailand
Political parties disestablished in 2019
Political parties established in 2006